The Saskatchewan Provincial Police was a police force in the Canadian province of Saskatchewan that existed from 1917 until 1928 under the Saskatchewan Provincial Police Act.

Created in 1917 to replace the Royal North-West Mounted Police (RNWMP), which was strained by involvement during World War I at the homefront with border patrols, enemy surveillance, and national security enforcement. The force took over provincial policing needs while national policing in Saskatchewan continued to be conducted by the RNWMP.

The force had a maximum strength ranging from 145 to 175 officers in the 1920s. The Royal Canadian Mounted Police "F" Division was contracted to act as the provincial police force after increasing costs led the provincial government to outsource the service.

Organization
The SPP was led by a Commissioner of Police:

 Charles Augustus Mahoney (1869–1941) 1917–1928 – former veteran Ontario Provincial Police officer was Chief Constable of the Saskatchewan Secret Service 1911-1917 

The force's rank and file consisted of a mix of former RNWMP officers, military personnel and others with no policing experience.

The other ranks on the force:

 Assistant Commissioner
 Inspector
 Noncommissioned officer
 sworn non-commissioned member
 constable
 Sergeant

The force had 79 detachments across the province and commanding headquarters in Regina.

Beginning on April 1, 2022, the 450 member Provincial Protective Services branch began operating and will complement the work of RCMP and city police forces

See also

 Alberta Provincial Police

References

Military history of Saskatchewan
Defunct law enforcement agencies of Canada
1917 establishments in Saskatchewan
1928 disestablishments in Saskatchewan